Mike McEwen may refer to:

 Mike McEwen (ice hockey) (born 1956), retired Canadian ice hockey player
 Mike McEwen (curler) (born 1980), Canadian curler